Thomas Vernon Ayres (April 27, 1909 – February 18, 1968) was a Canadian ice hockey defenceman. Ayres played six seasons in the National Hockey League for the New York Americans, Montreal Maroons, St. Louis Eagles and New York Rangers and twelve seasons of professional ice hockey overall.

Career statistics

Regular season and playoffs

References

External links

1909 births
1968 deaths
Canadian ice hockey defencemen
Hershey Bears players
Montreal Maroons players
New Haven Eagles players
New York Americans players
New York Rangers players
Pittsburgh Hornets players
Quebec Castors players
St. Louis Eagles players
St. Louis Flyers players
Ice hockey people from Toronto
Toronto Young Rangers players
Canadian expatriate ice hockey players in the United States